Henry Whitby was a captain in the Royal Navy. He fought during the French Revolutionary Wars and Napoleonic Wars. He joined the navy in 1794 as a midshipman. He married the second daughter of John Nicholson Inglefield.

References 

Trial of Captain Whitby.1812
 The Naval Chronicle: Volume 16, July–December 1806, Volume 16, p. 119
 Naval Court Marshall

Royal Navy personnel of the Napoleonic Wars
Royal Navy personnel of the French Revolutionary Wars